Smith's Wives is a 1935 British comedy film directed by H. Manning Haynes and starring Ernie Lotinga, Beryl de Querton and Tyrell Davis. A farcical situation occurs when a vicar and a bookmaker with the same surname are mistaken for each other. It was based on the play Facing the Music by James Darnley. It was Lotinga's only film in which he didn't play his trademark character Jimmy Josser.

Cast
 Ernie Lotinga as Jimmy Smith
 Beryl de Querton as Norah Smith
 Tyrell Davis as Dick Desmond
 Richard Ritchie as Reverend James Smith
 Kay Walsh as Mabel Smith
 Jean Gillie as Anne
 Vashti Taylor as Dierdre Fotheringay

References

Bibliography
 Sutton, David R. A chorus of raspberries: British film comedy 1929-1939. University of Exeter Press, 2000.

External links

1935 films
1935 comedy films
British comedy films
Films directed by H. Manning Haynes
British black-and-white films
1930s English-language films
1930s British films